Agama bocourti, also known commonly as Bocourt's agama, is a small species of lizard in the family Agamidae. The species is native to West Africa.

Etymology
The specific name, bocourti, is in honor of French zoologist Marie Firmin Bocourt.

Geographic range
A. bocourti is found in Gambia and Senegal.

Habitat
The preferred natural habitat of A. bocourti is unknown.

Reproduction
A. bocourti is oviparous.

References

Further reading
Barts M, Wilms T (2003). "Die Agamen der Welt ". Draco 4 (14): 4–23. (in German).
Rochebrune A-T (1884). Faune de la Sénégambie. Paris: Octave Douin. 221 pp. (Agama bocourti, new species, Reptiles Plate XI, figures 3 & 4). (in French).
Wermuth H (1967). "Liste der rezenten Amphibien und Retilien. Agamidae". Das Tierreich 86: 1–127. (Agama bocourti, p. 10). (in German).

Agama (genus)
Reptiles described in 1884
Taxa named by Alphonse Trémeau de Rochebrune